Limpus is a surname. Notable people with the surname include:

Arthur Limpus (1863–1931), British Royal Navy officer 
Richard Limpus (1824–1875), British organist and composer